Basic Training is a greatest hits album by American hip hop collective Boot Camp Clik, composed of singles released by Black Moon, Smif-N-Wessun, Heltah Skeltah and Originoo Gunn Clappaz between 1992 and 1999. It was released on March 14, 2000 via Priority Records. Production was handled by Da Beatminerz, BJ Swan, Black Market, Cuzin Bawb, E-Swift, Mark "Boogie" Brown, Self and Starang Wondah, with Buckshot and Drew "Dru-Ha" Friedman serving as executive producers.

The album features three songs from Black Moon's Enta da Stage, two songs from Smif-N-Wessun's Dah Shinin', two songs from Heltah Skeltah's Nocturnal, one song from O.G.C.'s Da Storm, one song from Boot Camp Clik's For the People, one song from Heltah Skeltah's Magnum Force, one song from Cocoa Brovaz' The Rude Awakening, one song from Black Moon's War Zone, and one song from O.G.C.'s The M-Pire Shrikez Back.

Track listing

Sample credits
Track 2 contains a sample of "Hydra" performed by Grover Washington Jr. and "My Philosophy" by KRS-One
Track 3 contains a sample of "Playing Your Game, Baby" performed by Barry White
Track 6 contains a interpolation of "Uzuri"
Track 10 contains a sample from "Hot Sex" performed by A Tribe Called Quest and "Pick It Up" performed by Redman
Track 12 contains a sample from "Heartbeat"

Personnel

Kenyatta "Buckshot" Blake – vocals (tracks: 1-3, 8, 9, 12), executive producer
Jack "Starang Wondah" McNair – vocals (tracks: 4, 6, 7, 9, 10, 13), producer (track 10)
Dashawn "Top Dog" Yates – vocals (tracks: 4, 6, 7, 9, 13)
Darrell "Steele" Yates Jr. – vocals (tracks: 4, 5, 9, 11)
Tekomin "Tek" Williams – vocals (tracks: 4, 5, 9, 11)
Barret "Louieville Sluggah" Powell – vocals (tracks: 6, 7, 9, 13)
Jahmal "Rock" Bush – vocals (tracks: 6, 8-10)
Sean "Ruck" Price – vocals (tracks: 6, 8-10)
Ronnie "Doc Holiday" Duren – vocals (track 10)
Corey "Raekwon" Woods – vocals (track 11)
Ewart "DJ Evil Dee" Dewgarde – producer (tracks: 1-5, 12)
Walter "Mr. Walt" Dewgarde – producer (tracks: 2-4, 7)
Paul "Baby Paul" Hendricks – producer (track 6)
Eric "E-Swift" Brooks – producer (track 8)
Derwin "BJ Swan" Benoit – producer (track 9)
Mark "Boogie" Brown – producer (track 9)
Robert "Cuzin Bob" Clark – producer (track 10)
Edward "Self" Hinson – producer (track 11)
Dwayne "Emperor" Searcy – producer (track 12)
Robert "Rob" McDowell – producer (track 12)
Drew "Dru-Ha" Friedman – executive producer

Charts

References

External links

Boot Camp Clik albums
2000 greatest hits albums
Albums produced by Da Beatminerz
Duck Down Music compilation albums
Priority Records compilation albums